Bettel may refer to:

 Bettel, Luxembourg, a village in the commune of Tandel
 Bettel (cards), a bid to take no tricks in certain card games
 Bettel v Yim, a 1978 Canadian tort case 
 Xavier Bettel (born 1973), Luxembourgish politician and lawyer
 Tania Bettel, Luxembourgish cyclist who won the 1992 women's National Championship
 Michael Bettel (died 2003), British drummer for the band Tank